Events in the year 1847 in Norway.

Incumbents
Monarch: Oscar I

Events

Arts and literature

Births

11 April – Ebbe Carsten Horneman Hertzberg, politician (d.1912)
14 April – Karl Lous, barrister (d. 1928).
17 April – Just Bing Ebbesen, priest and politician (d.1929)
31 July – Johan Kristian Skougaard, military officer and politician (d.1925)
20 October –Frits Thaulow, painter (d.1906)
26 October – Helge A. Haugan – Norwegian-American banking executive  (d.1909 in USA)
9 November – Carl Wilhelm Bøckmann Barth,  artist (d. 1919).
18 November – Oluf Iversen, politician (d.1917)
1 December – Agathe Backer Grøndahl, pianist and composer (d.1907).
15 December  – Rolf Andvord, shipowner and consul (d. 1906)
26 December – Hans Christian Albert Hansen, politician (d.1925)

Deaths
16 January – Ole Devegge, librarian, numismatist and collector (b.1772)

Full date unknown
Knut Andreas Pettersen Agersborg, politician (b.1765)
Paulus Flood, merchant and politician (b.1804)

See also

References